Daft Punk were a French electronic music duo formed in 1993 in Paris by Thomas Bangalter and Guy-Manuel de Homem-Christo. They achieved popularity in the late 1990s as part of the French house movement, combining elements of house music with funk, disco, rock and pop. They garnered acclaim and commercial success and are regarded as one of the most influential acts in dance music.

Bangalter and Homem-Christo formed Daft Punk after their indie rock band Darlin' disbanded and began experimenting with drum machines and synthesisers. Their debut studio album, Homework, was released by Virgin Records in 1997 to positive reviews, backed by the singles "Around the World" and "Da Funk". From 1999, Daft Punk assumed robot personas for public appearances, with helmets, outfits and gloves to disguise their identities; they made few media appearances. They were managed from 1996 to 2008 by Pedro Winter, the head of Ed Banger Records.

Daft Punk's second album, Discovery (2001), had further success, with the hit singles "One More Time", "Digital Love" and "Harder, Better, Faster, Stronger". It became the basis for an animated film, Interstella 5555, supervised by the Japanese artist Leiji Matsumoto. Daft Punk's third album, Human After All (2005), received mixed reviews, though the singles "Robot Rock" and "Technologic" achieved success in the United Kingdom. Daft Punk directed an avant-garde science-fiction film, Electroma, released in 2006. They toured throughout 2006 and 2007 and released the live album Alive 2007, which won a Grammy Award for Best Electronic/Dance Album; the tour is credited for popularising dance music in North America. Daft Punk composed the score for the 2010 film Tron: Legacy.

In 2013, Daft Punk left Virgin for Columbia Records and released their fourth and final album, Random Access Memories, to acclaim; the lead single, "Get Lucky", reached the top 10 in the charts of 27 countries. Random Access Memories won five Grammy Awards in 2014, including Album of the Year and Record of the Year for "Get Lucky". In 2016, Daft Punk gained their only number one on the Billboard Hot 100 with "Starboy", a collaboration with the Weeknd. In 2015, Rolling Stone ranked them the 12th greatest musical duo of all time. They announced their split in 2021.

History

1987–1992: Early career and Darlin'

Guy-Manuel de Homem-Christo and Thomas Bangalter met in 1987 while attending the Lycée Carnot secondary school in Paris. The two became friends and recorded demos with others from the school. In 1992, they formed a guitar group, Darlin', with Bangalter on bass, Homem-Christo on guitar, and Laurent Brancowitz on guitar and drums. The trio named themselves after the Beach Boys song "Darlin", which they covered along with an original composition. Both tracks were released on a multi-artist EP under Duophonic Records, a label owned by the London-based band Stereolab, who invited Darlin' to open for shows in the United Kingdom.

Darlin' disbanded after around six months, having produced four songs and played two gigs. Bangalter described the project as "pretty average". Brancowitz pursued music with another band, Phoenix. Bangalter and Homem-Christo formed Daft Punk and experimented with drum machines and synthesizers. The name was taken from a negative review of Darlin' in Melody Maker by Dave Jennings, who dubbed their music "a daft punky thrash". The band found the review amusing. Homem-Christo said, "We struggled so long to find [the name] Darlin', and [this name] happened so quickly."

1993–1996: First performances and singles

In September 1993, Daft Punk attended a rave at EuroDisney, where they met Stuart Macmillan of Slam, co-founder of the Scottish label Soma Quality Recordings. The demo tape given to Macmillan at the rave formed the basis for Daft Punk's debut single, "The New Wave", a limited release in 1994. The single also contained the final mix of "The New Wave" called "Alive", which was to be featured on Daft Punk's first album.

Daft Punk returned to the studio in May 1995 to record "Da Funk". It became their first commercially successful single. After the success of "Da Funk", Daft Punk looked to find a manager. The duo settled on Pedro Winter, who regularly promoted them and other artists at his Hype nightclubs. They signed with Virgin Records in September 1996 and made a deal to license its tracks to the major label through its production company, Daft Trax. Bangalter said that while they received numerous offers from record labels, they wanted to wait and ensure that they did not lose creative control. He considered the deal with Virgin more akin to a partnership.

In the mid-to-late nineties, Daft Punk performed live without costumes at various venues. In 1996, they made their first performance in the United States, at an Even Furthur event in Wisconsin. In addition to live original performances, they performed in clubs using vinyl records from their collection. They were known for incorporating numerous styles of music into their DJ sets at that time.

1997–1999: Homework 
Daft Punk released their debut album, Homework, in 1997. In February that year, the UK dance magazine Muzik published a Daft Punk cover feature and described Homework as "one of the most hyped debut albums in a long long time". According to The Village Voice, the album revived house music and departed from the Eurodance formula. Critic Alex Rayner wrote that it combined established club styles and the "burgeoning eclecticism" of big beat. In 1997, Daft Punk embarked on an international concert tour, Daftendirektour, using their home equipment for the live stage. On 25 May, they headlined the Tribal Gathering festival at Luton Hoo, England, with Orbital and Kraftwerk.

The most successful single from Homework was "Around the World". "Da Funk" was also included on The Saint film soundtrack. Daft Punk produced a series of music videos for Homework directed by Spike Jonze, Michel Gondry, Roman Coppola and Seb Janiak. The videos were collected in 1999 as D.A.F.T.: A Story About Dogs, Androids, Firemen and Tomatoes.

Bangalter and Homem-Christo both created record labels after the release of their debut album, releasing solo projects from themselves and their friends on Roulé and Crydamoure respectively. Homem-Christo released music as a member of Le Knight Club with Eric Chedeville, and Bangalter released music as a member of Together with DJ Falcon and founded the group Stardust with Alan Braxe and Benjamin Diamond. In 1998, Stardust released their only song, the chart hit "Music Sounds Better With You".

1999–2003: Discovery
Daft Punk's second album, Discovery, was released in 2001. The duo said it was an attempt to reconnect with the playful, open-minded attitude associated with the discovery phase of childhood. The album reached No. 2 in the UK, and its lead single, "One More Time", was a hit. The song is heavily autotuned and compressed. The singles "Digital Love" and "Harder, Better, Faster, Stronger" were also successful in the UK and on the US Dance Chart, and "Face to Face" hit number one on the US club play charts.

Discovery created a new generation of Daft Punk fans. It also saw Daft Punk debut their distinctive robot costumes; they had previously worn Halloween masks or bags for promotional appearances. Discovery was later named one of the best albums of the decade by publications including Pitchfork and Resident Advisor. In 2020, Rolling Stone included it at number 236 in its list of the "500 Greatest Albums of All Time". In 2021, Pitchfork cited Discovery as the centrepiece of Daft Punk's career, "an album that transcended the robots' club roots and rippled through the decades that followed".

Daft Punk partnered with the Japanese manga artist Leiji Matsumoto to create Interstella 5555, a feature-length animation set to Discovery. The first four episodes were shown on Toonami in 2001, and the finished film was released on DVD in 2003. That December, Daft Punk released Daft Club, a compilation of Discovery remixes. In 2001, Daft Punk released a 45-minute excerpt from a Daftendirektour performance as Alive 1997.

2004–2007: Human After All and Alive 2007

In March 2005, Daft Punk released their third album, Human After All, the result of six weeks of writing and recording. Reviews were mixed, with criticism for its repetitiveness and darker mood. "Robot Rock", "Technologic", "Human After All" and "The Prime Time of Your Life" were released as singles. A Daft Punk anthology CD/DVD, Musique Vol. 1 1993–2005, was released on 4 April 2006. Daft Punk also released a remix album, Human After All: Remixes.

On 21 May 2006, Daft Punk premiered a film, Daft Punk's Electroma, at the Cannes Film Festival sidebar Director's Fortnight. The film does not include Daft Punk's music. Midnight screenings of the film were held in Paris theaters starting from March 2007.

For 48 dates across 2006 and 2007, Daft Punk performed the Alive 2006/2007 world tour, performing a "megamix" of their music from a large LED-fronted pyramid. The tour was acclaimed and is credited for bringing dance music to a wider audience, especially in North America. The Guardian journalist Gabriel Szatan likened it to how the Beatles' 1964 performance on The Ed Sullivan Show had brought British rock and roll to the American mainstream.

Daft Punk's performance in Paris was released as their second live album, Alive 2007, on 19 November 2007. The live version of "Harder, Better, Faster, Stronger" was released as a single, with a video directed by Olivier Gondry comprising audience footage of their performance in Brooklyn. In 2009, Daft Punk won Grammy Awards for Alive 2007 and its single "Harder, Better, Faster, Stronger".

2008–2011: Tron: Legacy

Daft Punk made a surprise appearance at the 50th Grammy Awards on 10 February 2008, and appeared with rapper Kanye West to perform a reworked version of "Stronger" on stage at the Staples Center in Los Angeles. It was the first televised Daft Punk live performance.

In 2008, Daft Punk returned to Paris to work on new material. Winter also stepped down as their manager to focus attention on his Ed Banger Records label and his work as Busy P. He stated in a later interview that Daft Punk were working with an unspecified management company in Los Angeles. The duo held its Daft Arts production office at the Jim Henson Studios complex in Hollywood. In 2008, Daft Punk placed 38th in a worldwide official poll of DJ Mag after debuting at position 71 in the year before. Daft Punk provided new mixes for the video game DJ Hero, and appeared in the game as playable characters.

At the 2009 San Diego Comic-Con, it was announced that Daft Punk had composed 24 tracks for the film Tron: Legacy. Daft Punk's score was arranged and orchestrated by Joseph Trapanese. The band collaborated with him for two years on the score, from pre-production to completion. The score features an 85-piece orchestra, recorded at AIR Lyndhurst Studios in London. Joseph Kosinski, director of the film, referred to the score as a mixture of orchestral and electronic elements. Daft Punk also make a cameo as disc jockey programs wearing their trademark robot helmets within the film's virtual world. The soundtrack album was released on 6 December 2010. A music video for "Derezzed" premiered on the MTV Networks on the same day the album was released. The video, which features Olivia Wilde as the character Quorra in specially shot footage, along with images of Daft Punk in Flynn's Arcade, was later made available for purchase from the iTunes Store and included in the DVD and Blu-ray releases of the film. Walt Disney Records released a remix album, Tron: Legacy Reconfigured, on 5 April 2011.

In 2010, Daft Punk were admitted into the Ordre des Arts et des Lettres, an order of merit of France. Bangalter and Homem-Christo were individually awarded the rank of Chevalier (knight). On October of that year, Daft Punk made a surprise guest appearance during the encore of Phoenix's show at Madison Square Garden in New York City. They played a medley of "Harder, Better, Faster, Stronger" and "Around the World" before the song segued into Phoenix's song "1901". The duo also included elements of their tracks "Rock'n Roll", "Human After All", and "Together", one of Bangalter's releases as a member of Together.

2011–2015: Random Access Memories
 In 2011, Soma Records released a previously unpublished Daft Punk track, "Drive", recorded while they were signed to Soma in the 1990s. The track was included in a twentieth anniversary multi-artist compilation of the Soma label. In October 2012, Daft Punk provided a 15-minute mix of songs by blues musician Junior Kimbrough for Hedi Slimane's Yves Saint Laurent fashion show. Daft Punk recorded their fourth studio album, Random Access Memories, with musicians including Julian Casablancas, Todd Edwards, DJ Falcon, Panda Bear, Chilly Gonzales, Paul Williams, Pharrell Williams, Chic frontman Nile Rodgers and Giorgio Moroder. Daft Punk left Virgin for Sony Music Entertainment through the Columbia Records label.

Random Access Memories was released on 20 May 2013. The lead single, "Get Lucky", became Daft Punk's first UK number-one single and the most-streamed new song in the history of Spotify. At the 2013 MTV Video Music Awards, Daft Punk debuted a trailer for their single "Lose Yourself to Dance" and presented the award for "Best Female Video" alongside Rodgers and Pharrell. In December, they revealed a music video for the song "Instant Crush", directed by Warren Fu and featuring Julian Casablancas.

At the 56th Annual Grammy Awards, Random Access Memories won the Grammy for Best Dance/Electronica Album, Album of the Year and Best Engineered Album, Non-Classical, while "Get Lucky" received the Grammy for Best Pop Duo/Group Performance and Record of the Year. Daft Punk performed at the ceremony with Stevie Wonder, Rodgers, and Pharrell, as well as Random Access Memories rhythm section players Nathan East, Omar Hakim, Paul Jackson, Jr. and Chris Caswell.

Daft Punk co-produced Kanye West's sixth studio album, Yeezus (2013), creating the tracks "On Sight", "Black Skinhead", "I Am a God" and "Send It Up" with West. They provided additional vocals for Pharrell's 2014 single "Gust of Wind". On 10 March 2014, an unreleased Daft Punk song, "Computerized", leaked online. It features Jay-Z and contains "The Son of Flynn" from the Tron: Legacy soundtrack; it was once intended to be a single promoting Tron: Legacy. In April 2015, Daft Punk appeared in a short tribute to Rodgers as part of a documentary on his life, Nile Rodgers: From Disco to Daft Punk. In June, a documentary, Daft Punk Unchained, was released.

2016–present: Final projects and disbandment

Daft Punk appeared on the 2016 singles "Starboy" and "I Feel It Coming" by Canadian R&B singer the Weeknd; "Starboy" topped the Billboard Hot 100, becoming Daft Punk's only US number-one song, and "I Feel It Coming" reached number four. In 2017, Soma Records released a previously unreleased remix of the Daft Punk track "Drive", as part of a compilation featuring various artists.

In February 2017, Daft Punk launched a pop-up shop in Hollywood, California, featuring memorabilia, artwork, and a display of the various costumes the duo has worn over the years. The duo also performed with the Weeknd at the 59th Annual Grammy Awards on 12 February 2017.

Throughout the years following the Starboy collaborations, Bangalter and Homem-Christo worked solo as producers appearing on several projects. On 21 June 2017, the Australian band Parcels released the song "Overnight", produced and co-written by Daft Punk. The song was written after Daft Punk saw Parcels perform at a live show and invited the band members to the duo's studio. The song would be the duo's final released production.

In February 2019, it was announced that Daft Punk would launch an electronic art exhibition at the Philharmonie de Paris featuring various costumes, guitars, and other fixtures based on the theme of the duo's song "Technologic"; the exhibition ran from April 9 up until August 11 of that year.

On 22 February 2021, Daft Punk released a video on their YouTube channel titled "Epilogue". The video features a scene from their 2006 film Electroma, in which one robot explodes and the other walks away; a title card created with Warren Fu reads "1993–2021" while an excerpt of Daft Punk's song "Touch" plays. Later that day, Daft Punk's longtime publicist Kathryn Frazier confirmed that the duo had split, but did not give a reason for their disbandment. The news led to a surge in Daft Punk sales, with digital album purchases rising by 2,650 percent. Their friend and collaborator Todd Edwards clarified that Bangalter and Homem-Christo remain active separately.

On 22 February 2022, one year after their disbandment, Daft Punk announced the digital release of a 25th anniversary edition of Homework, featuring a newly collected remix album of Homework. The remix album was later released on physical formats. The same day as the anniversary announcement, the band held a one-time Twitch stream of their performance at the Mayan Theater in Los Angeles from their 1997 Daftendirektour. The video featured previously unreleased footage of the duo without costumes. Uploads of behind the scenes "archives" from the D.A.F.T. DVD and vinyl reissues of the band's albums continued regularly throughout 2022. 

On 22 February 2023, Daft Punk announced a 10th-anniversary reissue of Random Access Memories, scheduled for 12 May. It will include 35 minutes of previously unreleased outtakes and demos.

Artistry

Musical style
Daft Punk's musical style has mainly been described as house, French house, electronic, dance, and disco. Sean Cooper of AllMusic describes their musical style as a blend of acid house, techno, pop, indie rock, hip hop, progressive house, funk, and electro. They incorporated extensive sampling; Guardian chief critic Alex Petridis described their approach to music and art as "magpie"-like.

In the early 1990s, Daft Punk drew inspiration from rock and acid house in the UK. Homem-Christo referred to Screamadelica by Primal Scream as the record that "put everything together" in terms of genre. In 2009, Bangalter named Andy Warhol as one of Daft Punk's early influences.  On the Homework track "Teachers", Daft Punk list musicians who influenced them, including funk musician George Clinton, rapper and producer Dr Dre, and Chicago house and Detroit techno artists including Paul Johnson, Romanthony and Todd Edwards. Homem-Christo said: "Their music had a big effect on us. The sound of their productions—the compression, the sound of the kick drum and Romanthony's voice, the emotion and soul—is part of how we sound today."

Discovery saw Daft Punk integrating influences from 70s disco and 80s crooners, and featured collaborations with Romanthony and Edwards. A major inspiration was the Aphex Twin single "Windowlicker", which was "neither a purely club track nor a very chilled-out, down-tempo relaxation track", according to Bangalter. The duo used vintage equipment to recreate sounds from older artists, such as the use of a Wurlitzer piano to evoke Supertramp on "Digital Love".

For the Tron: Legacy soundtrack, Daft Punk drew inspiration from Wendy Carlos, the composer of the original Tron film, as well as Max Steiner, Bernard Herrmann, John Carpenter, Vangelis, Philip Glass and Maurice Jarre. For Random Access Memories, Daft Punk sought a "west coast vibe", referencing acts such as Fleetwood Mac, the Doobie Brothers and the Eagles, and the French electronic musician Jean Michel Jarre.

Image

During promotional appearances in the 1990s, Daft Punk wore black bags on their heads or Halloween masks. In one early magazine appearance, Homem-Christo said: "We don't want to be photographed. [...] We don't especially want to be in magazines. We have a responsibility." Although they allowed a camera crew to film them for a French arts program at the time, Daft Punk did not wish to speak on screen "because it is dangerous". According to  Orla Lee-Fisher, head of marketing at Virgin Records UK, in the early days of their career Daft Punk would consent to photographs without masks while they were DJing; otherwise, they would use disguises. In 1997, Bangalter said they had a "general rule about not appearing in videos".

In 2001, for Discovery, Daft Punk began wearing robot-like helmets and gloves for promotional appearances and performances. The helmets were produced by Paul Hahn of Daft Arts and the French directors Alex and Martin. With engineering by Tony Gardner and Alterian, Inc., they are capable of various LED effects. Wigs were originally attached to both helmets, but Daft Punk removed them moments before unveiling them. According to Bangalter, "The mask gets very hot, but after wearing it as long as I have, I am used to it." Later helmets were fitted with ventilators to prevent overheating.

Daft Punk introduced the costumes during a special presentation of Discovery videos during Cartoon Network's Toonami block. Bangalter said of their transformation: "We did not choose to become robots. There was an accident in our studio. We were working on our sampler, and at exactly 9:09 am on September 9, 1999, it exploded. When we regained consciousness, we discovered that we had become robots."

Daft Punk made few media appearances. Bangalter said they wanted the focus to be on their music, and that masks allowed them to control their image while retaining their anonymity and protecting their personal lives. They used the robot outfits to merge the characteristics of humans and machines. Bangalter said that the costumes were initially the result of shyness: "But then it became exciting from the audience's point of view. It's the idea of being an average guy with some kind of superpower." He described it as an advanced version of glam, "where it's definitely not you".

With the release of Human After All, Daft Punk wore simplified helmets and black leather jackets and trousers. The attire was designed by Hedi Slimane. Bangalter said: "We never like to do the same thing twice. It's more fun and entertaining for us to do something different, whether it's wearing masks or developing a persona that merges fiction and reality. We're happy to give back to the masses." On the set of Electroma, Daft Punk were interviewed with their backs turned, and in 2006 they wore cloth bags over their heads during a televised interview. They said the use of cloth bags had been a spontaneous decision, reflecting their willingness to experiment with their image in the media.

The mystery surrounding Daft Punk's identity and their elaborate disguises have added to their popularity. Their costumes have been compared to the makeup of Kiss and the leather jacket worn by Iggy Pop. Daft Punk wore the robot costumes in their performances at the 2008, 2014 and 2017 Grammy Awards. During the 2014 ceremony, they also accepted their awards on stage in the outfits, with Pharrell and Paul Williams speaking on the duo's behalf. In both their appearance at the 2017 Grammy Awards and in the Weeknd's "I Feel It Coming" music video, the duo wore long black capes and chrome-plated gloves along with their helmets.

Bangalter said that the 1974 film Phantom of the Paradise, in which the title character prominently wears a mask, was "the foundation for a lot of what we're about artistically". The film stars Paul Williams, with whom Daft Punk later collaborated. Daft Punk were also fans of the 1970s band Space, known for wearing space suits with helmets that hid their appearance.

Appearances in media

Daft Punk's popularity has been partially attributed to their appearances in mainstream media. The duo appeared with Juliette Lewis in an advertisement for Gap, featuring the single "Digital Love", and were contractually obliged to appear only in Gap clothing. In the summer of 2001, Daft Punk appeared in an advertisement on Cartoon Network's Toonami timeslot, promoting the official Toonami website and the duo's animated music videos for their album Discovery. The music videos later appeared as scenes in the feature-length film Interstella 5555: The 5tory of the 5ecret 5tar 5ystem, in which Daft Punk make a cameo appearance as their robot alter-egos. The duo later appeared in a television advertisement wearing their Discovery-era headgear to promote Sony Ericsson's Premini mobile phone. In 2010, Daft Punk appeared in Adidas advertisements promoting a Star Wars-themed clothing line.

Daft Punk have also produced music for other artists. They produced the Teriyaki Boyz's debut single "HeartBreaker" on the album Beef or Chicken?. The song contains a sample of "Human After All". Daft Punk later produced N.E.R.D.'s song "Hypnotize U". Daft Punk made a cameo in Tron: Legacy as nightclub DJs.

In 2011, Coca-Cola distributed limited edition bottles designed by Daft Punk, called Daft Coke. They were only sold in France. A newer version of these themed bottles now exist as collectors items, some parts of the bottles such as the cap and Coke logo being plated in gold. Daft Punk, along with Courtney Love were photographed for the "Music Project" of fashion house Yves Saint Laurent. The duo appear in their new sequined suits custom made by Hedi Slimane, holding and playing their new instruments with bodies made of lucite. In 2013, Bandai Tamashii released a S.H. Figuarts (SHF) action figure for Daft Punk coinciding with the release of Random Access Memories in Japan. Following a series a teaser trailers, Daft Punk made a rare public appearance at the 2013 Monaco Grand Prix in May on behalf of the Lotus F1 Team, who supported the duo by racing in specially-branded cars emblazoned with the band's logo.

Footage of Daft Punk's 2006 performance at the Coachella Festival was featured in the documentary film Coachella: 20 Years in the Desert, released on YouTube in April 2020. Daft Punk were scheduled to appear on the August 6, 2013 episode of The Colbert Report to promote Random Access Memories. They were unable to do so because of contractual obligations regarding their later appearance at the 2013 MTV Video Music Awards. According to Stephen Colbert, Daft Punk were unaware of any exclusivity agreement and were halted by MTV executives the morning prior to the taping. In 2015, Daft Punk appeared alongside several other musicians to announce their co-ownership of the music service Tidal at its relaunch.

Eden, a 2014 French drama film, has as its protagonist a techno fan-turned-DJ-turned recovering addict. It features Daft Punk (portrayed by actors) during different stages of their careers. An hour-long documentary, Daft Punk Unchained, was televised on 24 June 2015 in France and on 9 February 2016 in the UK. Daft Punk's helmets can be worn by the player in the 2022 video games Pokémon Scarlet and Violet.

Legacy
Daft Punk are regarded as one of the most influential dance acts in history. In 2015, Rolling Stone ranked them the 12th greatest musical duo of all time. The chief Guardian music critic Alexis Petridis named Daft Punk the most influential pop artists of the 21st century. Their collaborator Pharrell Williams said they were responsible for the rise of contemporary EDM, though Bangalter was noncommittal about this, saying only that other acts were using "gimmicks that at the time [Daft Punk used them] were not really gimmicks".

In "Losing My Edge", the first single by LCD Soundsystem, singer James Murphy jokingly bragged about being the first to "play Daft Punk to the rock kids". LCD Soundsystem also recorded the song "Daft Punk Is Playing at My House", which reached No. 29 in the UK and was nominated for Best Dance Recording at the 2006 Grammy Awards. The Soulwax remix of the song also contains samples of many Daft Punk tracks as well as tracks by Thomas Bangalter.

Daft Punk tracks have been sampled or covered by other artists. "Technologic" was sampled by Swizz Beatz for the Busta Rhymes song "Touch It". In a later remix of "Touch It" the line "touch it, bring it, pay it, watch it, turn it, leave it, start, format it" from "Technologic" was sung by R&B and rap artist Missy Elliott. Kanye West's 2007 song "Stronger" from the album Graduation borrows the melody and features a vocal sample of Daft Punk's "Harder, Better, Faster, Stronger". Daft Punk's robotic costumes make an appearance in the music video for "Stronger". The track "Daftendirekt" from Daft Punk's album Homework was sampled for the Janet Jackson song "So Much Betta" from her 2008 album Discipline.

The track "Aerodynamic" was sampled for Wiley's 2008 single "Summertime". "Veridis Quo" from Discovery was sampled for the Jazmine Sullivan song "Dream Big" from her 2008 album Fearless. Daft Punk's "Around the World" was sampled for JoJo's 2009 song "You Take Me (Around the World)". The song "Cowboy George" by the Fall contains a clip of "Harder, Better, Faster, Stronger". A cappella group Pentatonix performed a medley of Daft Punk songs, released as a YouTube video.  As of November 2021, the video had been viewed over 355 million times. The medley won for Best Arrangement, Instrumental or a Cappella of the 57th Grammy Awards.

A Daft Punk medley was played at the 2017 Bastille Day parade by a French military band, in front of French President Emmanuel Macron and his many guests, who included a bemused US President Donald Trump. Baicalellia daftpunka, a species of flatworm, was named after Daft Punk in 2018 because part of the organism resembles a helmet.

Discography

Studio albums
 Homework (1997)
 Discovery (2001)
 Human After All (2005)
 Random Access Memories (2013)

Concert tours
 Daftendirektour (1997)
 Alive 2006/2007 (2006–07)

Awards and nominations
In October 2011, Daft Punk placed 28th in a "top-100 DJs of 2011" list by DJ Magazine after placing in the 44th position the year before. On 19 January 2012, Daft Punk ranked No. 2 on Mixmag's Greatest Dance Acts of All Time, with The Prodigy at No. 1 by just a few points.

Bibliography
Tony Gaenic, Daft Punk de A à Z, l'Étudiant, les guides MusicBook, 2002, p. 115, 
Violaine Schütz, Daft Punk, l'histoire d'un succès planétaire, Scali, 2008, 
Stéphane Jourdain, French Touch, le Castor Astral, Castormusic, 2005|p. 189, 
Philippe Poirrier, Daft Punk, la Toile et le disco. Revival culturel à l’heure du numérique, French Cultural Studies, 2015, p. 381
Peter Shapiro, Modulations, une histoire de la musique électronique, éditions Allia, 2004, p. 340, 
Pauline Guéna, Anne-Sophie Jahn, DAFT, Éditions Grasset, 2022, p. 216,

References

External links

 
 
 
 Daft Punk discography at MusicTea
 
 
 Daft Punk on Eurochannel

 
1993 establishments in France
2021 disestablishments in France
Ableton Live users
Bands with fictional stage personas
Brit Award winners
Club DJs
Electronic dance music duos
Electronic music duos
French DJs
French electronic music groups
French house music groups
French musical duos
Grammy Award winners for dance and electronic music
Lycée Carnot alumni
Male musical duos
Masked musicians
Musical groups established in 1993
Musical groups disestablished in 2021
Musical groups from Paris
Remixers
Columbia Records artists
Parlophone artists
Virgin Records artists
Walt Disney Records artists
Warner Records artists